The Christian Legal Centre (CLC) is a private company which was set up in December 2007 which acts in a number of high-profile cases purportedly on behalf of Evangelical Christians in the United Kingdom. It has lost most of its legal cases. Observers believe the centre has adopted tactics from wealthy evangelical groups in the US, notably the powerful Alliance Defence Fund, and raised questions about its funding.  They are linked to the Christian Concern campaigning organisation.  The group campaigns on gender sexuality, and marriage, which it claims is “the union between one man and one woman”.
It labels homosexuality, as well as pre-marital sex and pornography, a “problem”.

Cases

Since its inception, the CLC has involved itself in a number of high-profile cases in the UK including:

Other activities 

In 2010 the Christian Legal Centre, Christian Concern and the Alliance Defending Freedom launched the Wilberforce Academy, a Christian residential programme. The one-week conference trains students and young professionals to apply the Christian faith to their vocations. Some of its delegates go on to work for the Christian Legal Centre and Christian Concern. The programme has often been held at Oxbridge colleges, prompting complaints from students. In 2022, Worcester College, Oxford acknowledged to having misled students in an email that suggested attendees had acted improperly.

Criticism and scrutiny 
In 2011, The Guardian raised questions over how the CLC is funded and noted structural similarities to the Alliance Defense Fund, an American conservative Christian legal advocacy group. Speaking with The Guardian, Keith Porteous Wood of the National Secular Society said of the CLC, "they don't seem so keen to support religious liberty for Muslims or atheists".

The CLC was the subject of a November 2018 BBC Radio documentary, A Tale of Belief and the Courts, written and presented by Joshua Rozenberg.

In 2020, the pseudonymous "The Secret Barrister" criticised the CLC and other fundamentalist groups in their book titled Fake Law. The Secret Barrister accused these parties of "casting a fog over the facts and drilling into our deepest and most primal fears" while "pushing their own agendas". A consultant for the CLC, Pavel Stroilov, called this "an elitist rant".

Alfie Evans case

Exploitation concerns 
In 2018, a High Court judge expressed serious concerns over the conduct of CLC consultant Pavel Stroilov during the Alfie Evans case. Mr. Justice Hayden described Stroilov as a "fanatical and deluded young man" whose "malign hand" was "inconsistent with the real interests of the parents' case." The judge aso accused CLC activists of doing the parents "far more harm than it does them good" and said submissions were "littered with vituperation and bile." The CLC's submissions declared that "Alfie's best interests are irrelevant" when compared to the parents' wishes and this was described as a "startling proposition" by Mr. Justice Hayden. The CLC described the judges' comments as "unfair."

Mary Holmes, former solicitor for the parents of Alfie Evans, accused the CLC of exploiting the case for their own benefit.“These people, I don’t believe are in it because they love Alfie. When this case is over they’ll move on to the next. Or they’ll find some other cause they can ride on the back of. [...] I just think they pick on the vulnerable and they are easy prey. Keep this child alive at any cost and not for the right reasons. [...] It’s getting them in the public eye – it’s like, we’ve got involved, look what we’ve done, we’ve got an audience with the Pope.”

False advice 
Three court of appeal judges said a letter from Stroilov to the parents of Alfie Evans was “misleading to the extent of giving the father false advice”. The letter in question advised Evans' father that it would be lawful to remove Alfie from Alder Hey hospital. The court heard that this led to a confrontation at the hospital, in which Alfie was involved, and police were called. A court of appeal judge said that the letter was "disseminated on social media (presumably with the knowledge of Mr Stroilov),"

Notable people

Andrea Minichiello Williams 
Evangelical activist and barrister Andrea Minichiello Williams is chief executive of the CLC and Christian Concern. She began public policy work with the Lawyers' Christian Fellowship (LCF) in the 1990s in opposition to liberalising the laws around the status of embryos and to civil partnerships. As a member of the General Synod of the Church of England, Williams called gay Christians to "repent" and for the expulsion of gay priests from the Church of England, saying that gay people were the "children of the devil". Williams has publicly opposed the Church of England's decision to support civil partnerships.

Williams is reported as stating that the Human Fertilisation Bill was "the work of the devil", that homosexuality is sinful, that abortion should be illegal, and that the world is around 4,000 years old. Williams refers to abortion as a "silent holocaust". She sees abortion laws as "the work of satan."

The Channel 4 Dispatches documentary "In God's Name", which first aired on 19 May 2008, featured Williams and documented her lobbying the British Government on issues such as abortion, gay rights and the enforcing of laws relating to blasphemy. The programme included footage of Williams' meetings with Conservative politicians Norman Tebbit and Nadine Dorries, both of whom have worked with the LCF to influence policy on matters where they had a common agenda. When director David Modell asked William she believes Islam is the 'work of the devil' Williams replied "I believe that Islam is a false religion yes." In the documentary, Williams addresses the LCF's track record of losing cases by saying "it's vital that these issues are aired and won in the court room." David Modell concludes that, "perhaps one of the problems is that she relies on evidence that has no apparent basis in reality." Williams also discussed her involvement in the Andrew McClintock case - a magistrate who opposed gay adoption cases and who received support from LCF. Williams stated:it's not about the oppression of the homosexual community but the evidence shows that children raised in those households are more likely to be gender confused, more likely to be drug dependent, more likely to not finish school.

Relationship with Nadine Dorries 
Williams had a close working relationship with British Conservative politician Nadine Dorries. Williams was a team member of Dorries' campaign to reduce the upper limit on abortion to 20 weeks – a campaign that was partly funded by Christian Concern. Williams who wrote the anti-abortion amendments for Dorries. In the Channel 4 Dispatches documentary, "In God's Name", Dorries was asked how closely she worked with Williams and replied, "Closely? We've been stuck to the hip. Very closely." In reference to her campaign, Dorries also said:What goes on in here would have no structure whatsover, no sense of achievement if it wasn't for people like Andrea on the outside. Williams, who was sat next to her, proceeded to say "I believe that Islam is a false religion" and switched off her microphone.

Pavel Stroilov 
Stroilov is a consultant for the CLC. Stroilov says he is an exiled Russian dissident who smuggled top secret Kremlin files into Britain after stealing them from the Gorbachev Foundation's archive. During his work on the Alfie Evans case a judge described his behaviour as “profoundly depressing to say the least". Stroilov previously worked as an aide for former leader of UKIP Gerard Batten when Batten was an MEP. Batten and Stroilov co-authored a book titled "The Inglorious Revolution." Stroilov advised the parents of Alfie Evans to pursue a private prosecution for conspiracy murder against doctors at Alder Hey Children's Hospital.

Bruno Quintavalle 
The CLC works closely with Italian lawyer Bruno Quintavalle. Quintavalle is a former leader of the anti-abortion political party ProLife Alliance. Cases he worked on via the CLC include that of Alfie Evans and Archie Battersbee. Quintavalle campaigned to repeal the Human Fertilisation Bill.

See also 
 Christian Concern (sister organisation)
 Christian Institute
 Evangelical Alliance
 Christian Action, Research and Education
 Christian Voice (UK)

References

External links 
 

Anti-abortion organisations in the United Kingdom
Lobbying organisations in the United Kingdom
Organizations established in 2007
Christian political organizations
Christian organisations based in the United Kingdom